Nannaria terricola is a species of flat-backed millipede in the family Xystodesmidae. It is found in the Great Lakes region of the United States.

References

Further reading

 

Polydesmida
Millipedes of North America
Arthropods of the United States
Endemic fauna of the United States
Animals described in 1928
Articles created by Qbugbot